Philip Clay Roettinger (September 22, 1915 – January 7, 2002) was a CIA Operations Officer who helped plan and execute the 1954 overthrow of the Left-Wing Guatemalan government led by Jacobo Arbenz

Biography
The son of former Ohio Judge S. C. Roettinger, Roettinger graduated from Ohio Wesleyan University and served as a U.S. Marine Corps Colonel in the Pacific during World War II. He was a member of the U.S. shooting team in the 1948 Summer Olympics in London. After the CIA, Roettinger settled in San Miguel de Allende, Mexico to devote time to painting and raising a family.

References

1915 births
2002 deaths
People of the Central Intelligence Agency
Sportspeople from Cincinnati
American male sport shooters
Olympic shooters of the United States
Shooters at the 1948 Summer Olympics